Rage in Heaven is a 1941 American psychological thriller film noir about the destructive power of jealousy. It was directed by W.S. Van Dyke and based on the 1932 novel by James Hilton. It features Robert Montgomery, Ingrid Bergman, and George Sanders.

Plot
The film opens with the following quote: "Heaven hath no rage like love to hatred turned." which is incorrectly attributed to Milton (quote is from William Congreve's The Mourning Bride).

At a mental institution in Paris, Doctor Rameau (Oscar Homolka) discusses with the British consul the case of a man who identifies himself as Ward Andrews. The doctor believes Andrews to be English and wants the consul's assistance in verifying this. Outwardly the man may seem sane, but underneath he suffers from paranoia, suicidal tendencies and is capable of murder. The doctor takes the consul to meet Andrews, but they discover he has escaped.

Phillip Monrell (Robert Montgomery) and his former college roommate Ward Andrews (George Sanders) run into each other in London and Monrell invites his old friend back to his family home. When they arrive, they   meet Stella Bergen (Ingrid Bergman), the secretary of Phillip's mother (Lucile Watson). Both men are strongly attracted to her. She is friendly with the more responsible, hardworking Ward but prefers and marries the idle Phillip instead. Ward leaves for a job in Scotland.

Phillip is put in charge of the family steel mill but is not suited to the position. He begins to exhibit signs of mental illness, in particular, abnormal suspicion that his wife and Ward are in love. Despite this jealousy, he invites Ward for a visit and hires him to be the chief engineer at the mill. Eventually, Phillip's paranoia drives him to try to kill his perceived rival at work. Ward confronts him, admits his love for Stella, quits the steel mill, and returns to London.

After a frightening moment with her husband, Stella leaves him and goes to Ward. Phillip promises to grant her a divorce if Ward will return to talk with him in person. Having prepared a plan designed to frame Ward, Phillip provokes a loud argument with him which he knows is being overheard by a servant.

Afterwards, Phillip kills himself, after ensuring that Ward will be arrested for murder. Ward is convicted and sentenced to be executed. The day before the execution, Stella is visited by Dr. Rameau. He has seen a photo of Phillip in a newspaper and informs her that her husband was a patient who masqueraded as Ward Andrews and escaped from the institution. He is convinced that Phillip committed suicide and that he would have left some message bragging about it. Phillip's mother reveals that her son kept diaries; then, Clark (Aubrey Mather), the butler, remembers that he mailed a package to Paris the night Ward visited and Phillip died. Stella and Rameau take a flight to France and find the book, which exonerates Ward.

Cast

 Robert Montgomery as Philip Monrell
 Ingrid Bergman as Stella Bergen
 George Sanders as  Ward Andrews
 Lucile Watson as Mrs. Monrell
 Oskar Homolka as Dr. Rameau
 Philip Merivale as Mr. Higgins

 Matthew Boulton as Ramsbotham
 Aubrey Mather as Clark
 Frederick Worlock as Solicitor-General
 Francis Compton as Bardsley
 Gilbert Emery as Mr. Black
 Ludwig Hardt as Durand (credited as Ludwig Hart)

Reception
When the film opened, in March 1941, New York Times critic Bosley Crowther looked to a wartorn world and observed: “At a time when the world is already sufficiently concerned with paranoiacs, Metro has oddly seen fit to create yet another—and a thoroughly unsympathetic one.... True, the depredations of this wholly fictitious marplot are comfortably confined to the screen—and that is a blessing, at least. But why he should ever have been invented, why he should have been so clumsily conceived and why Robert Montgomery should have been chosen to play him is hard to understand. Certainly, the picture itself fails to offer any adequate justification.... Ingrid Bergman plays with a warm and sincere intensity which is deeply affecting.... But Mr. Montgomery in the focal role is inclined toward a deadpan deliberateness which grows monotonous... he never really suggests a mental crack-up. He is just a fellow with a mean disposition—a pointlessly diabolic wretch. It has been reported from Hollywood that Mr. Montgomery was compelled to play this role as "discipline" for some things he said in public about motion pictures. That may be an explanation for the general obtuseness of the film, but it seems like a desperate device. There is such a thing, you know, as cutting off one's nose to spite's one's face. And, in turning out Rage in Heaven, Metro hasn't done itself any good.”

Writing in 2011, film critic Dennis Schwartz was disappointed with the film and wrote about the problems on the set: "MGM forced Montgomery to make this pic under threat of suspending him and cutting his studio salary. ... Montgomery wanted time off the seven-year contract for a vacation. To get even with the studio Montgomery decided to just read his lines in a deadpan manner and not act. This ruse didn't help a pic that needed all the help it could get, as the plot was far-fetched and the melodramatics were stilted."

References

External links

 
 
 
 
 

1941 films
1940s psychological thriller films
American black-and-white films
American psychological thriller films
Film noir
Films based on British novels
Films directed by Richard Thorpe
Films directed by W. S. Van Dyke
Films scored by Bronisław Kaper
Films set in England
Films set in Paris
Films set in London
Metro-Goldwyn-Mayer films
Films scored by Mario Castelnuovo-Tedesco
1940s English-language films
1940s American films